Mitchell Livingston WerBell III (March 18, 1918 – December 17, 1983) was an OSS operative, mercenary, paramilitary trainer, firearms engineer, and arms dealer.

Early life and OSS service 
WerBell was born in Philadelphia, the son of a Czarist cavalry officer in the Imperial Army of Russia.  Journalist Penny Lernoux described WerBell in her 1984 book In Banks We Trust as "a mysterious White Russian." In 1942 WerBell joined the Office of Strategic Services (OSS) and served in China, Burma, and French Indochina.  As a guerrilla operative during World War II, he carried out a secret mission for the OSS under the command of Paul Helliwell in China with E. Howard Hunt, Lucien Conein, John K. Singlaub and Ray Cline. Following World War II, WerBell briefly worked as the director of advertising and public relations for Rich's, a department store in Atlanta, Georgia; he left after a year to open his own PR firm.

SIONICS 
After WerBell closed his PR firm to design suppressors for firearms, he incorporated SIONICS to design suppressors for the M16 rifle. The name was an acronym for "Studies In the Operational Negation of Insurgents and Counter-Subversion".  Through SIONICS he developed a low cost, efficient suppressor for machine guns.

In 1967 he partnered with Gordon B. Ingram, inventor of the MAC-10 submachine gun. They added WerBell's suppressor to Ingram's machinegun and attempted to market it to the U.S. military as "Whispering Death" for use in the Vietnam War.  WerBell is credited with over 25 different suppressor designs and the "WerBell Relief Valve", a mechanism designed for machinegun suppressors.  WerBell's modular designs and use of exotic materials such as titanium in sound suppressors influence their design to the present day.

SIONICS was absorbed by Military Armament Corporation (MAC), later called Cobray, where WerBell developed a training center for counterterrorism in the 1970s.  The courses lasted 11 weeks and students included members of the military, high-risk executives, CIA agents, and private individuals.  WerBell concurrently ran Defense Systems International, an arms brokerage firm.

Mercenary activities 
In the 1950s, WerBell served as a security advisor to Dominican dictator Rafael Trujillo and to the Batista regime in Cuba. 

WerBell helped plan an invasion of Haiti by Cuban and Haitian exiles against "Papa Doc" François Duvalier in 1966  called Project Nassau (but internally referred to as Operation Istanbul). The mission, which, according to Federal Communications Commission (FCC) and the Special Subcommittee on Investigations of the House Commerce Committee, was financially subsidized, and to be filmed by CBS News, was aborted when the participants were arrested by the FBI. WerBell was released without being charged.

In 1972 WerBell was approached by the Abaco Independence Movement (AIM) from the Abaco Islands, a region of the Bahamas, who were worried about the direction the Bahamas were taking and were considering other options, such as independence or remaining a separate Commonwealth nation under the Crown in case of the Bahamas gaining independence (which they did in 1973). AIM was funded by the Phoenix Foundation, a group that helps to build micronations. The AIM collapsed into internal bickering before a coup by Werbell could be carried out.

In 1973 WerBell was asked to assist with a coup d'état against Omar Torrijos of Panama, according to CIA documents released in 1993. WerBell sought clearance from the CIA which denied getting involved in coups. The plan was not implemented, though Torrijos died in a plane crash five years later.

In a 1979 20/20 interview WerBell claimed that Coca-Cola had hired him for $1 million to take care of kidnapping threats against its Argentine executives during an urban terrorist wave in 1973. Coca-Cola later denied the claim.

In a 1981 interview, WerBell revealed he was about to break with the U.S. Labor Party, whose security staff he has been training at his Powder Springs, Georgia estate.

Later in life WerBell claimed he was a retired Lieutenant General in the Royal Free Afghan Army or sometimes an Afghan Defense Minister after supplying Afghanistan with large weapons contracts and training.  WerBell claimed he was given the billet of Major General in the US Army to allow him to travel freely in Southeast Asia during the Vietnam War to demonstrate and sell his silenced submachineguns and sound suppressors.  This has been confirmed by Major General John Singlaub and Lt Col. William Mozey.

Other exploits 

WerBell and Mario Sandoval Alarcón's associate Leonel Sisniega Otero plotted a coup in Guatemala that failed in 1982.

In 1988, Sheriff Sherman Block of Los Angeles announced that Hustler publisher Larry Flynt wrote WerBell a $1 million check in 1983 to kill Hugh Hefner (founder of Playboy), Bob Guccione (founder of Penthouse), Walter Annenberg (owner of Triangle Publications), and Frank Sinatra. Los Angeles television station KNBC displayed a photocopy of the check. WerBell died in Los Angeles a month after receiving the check.

Death and courtroom poisoning claim 
In the 1989 Cotton Club murder case of Roy Radin, Arthur Michael Pascal, then owner of a Beverly Hills security firm, testified that prosecution witness William Rider, Flynt's former brother-in-law and private security agent, "told him of poisoning soldier of fortune Mitchell WerBell III in 1983 in order to take over WerBell's counterterrorist school based in Atlanta. Pascal said that Rider and... Flynt, poured four to six ounces of a digoxin, a powerful heart relaxant, into WerBell's drink during a cocktail party at Flynt's Los Angeles mansion. WerBell, 65, a security consultant for Flynt... died of a heart attack at UCLA Medical Center a few days later." Flynt and his attorney, Alan Isaacman, were in Bangkok and "unavailable for comment, according to a Hustler magazine spokeswoman". "Isaacman characterized an earlier Rider claim of a Flynt-paid murder contract as 'fantasy.'" Rider passed a polygraph test regarding "possible involvement in homicides," according to courtroom testimony. Pascal was later arraigned on a murder charge due to tapes Rider provided investigators.

See also 
Cobray Company
Military Armament Corporation (MAC)

References

Bibliography
 Hougan, Jim (1978). Spooks: The Haunting of America & the Private Use of Secret Agents. New York: William Morrow. .

Further reading 
 AP (Dec. 18, 1983). "Mitchell Livingston WerBell: Anti-Communist Arms Dealer." New York Times. p. 52. Archived from the original.
 Eringer, Robert (1986). "Interview With the Antiterrorist." Interview with Mitchell L. WerBell III. SAGA (magazine). pp. 6-9. Archived.

External links 
 FBI files at Internet Archive released in response to FOIA requests and appeals on behalf of Alan Jules Weberman 
 Biography at Spartacus Educational
 Cuban Exiles - Project Nassau documents
 Related newspaper article from MIT archives: Special Subcommittee on Investigations of the House Commerce Committee
 American Mercenaries: The True Story of Mitchell L. WerBell III (documentary)

1918 births
1983 deaths
Arms traders
American mercenaries
Firearm designers
American military personnel of World War II